The Pulaski Day Parade is a parade held annually since 1936 on Fifth Avenue in New York City to commemorate Kazimierz Pulaski, a Polish hero of the American Revolutionary War. The parade runs from 35th to 54th Streets passing by St. Patrick's Cathedral. It is held on the first Sunday of October and closely coincides with the October 11th General Pulaski Memorial Day, a national observance of his death at the Siege of Savannah. The parade features Polish dancers, Polish Supplementary schools and organizations, Polish soccer teams and their mascots, Polish Scouts (ZHP), and Polish Government ambassadors and representatives. 

The Parade was first held in 1937. Its founder was Francis J. Wazeter, president of the Downstate New York division of the Polish American Congress. There was no parade in 1942 nor 2020.

It is one of the oldest ethnic parades in NYC.

See also
 Casimir Pulaski Day, a holiday celebrated in the Midwestern U.S. commemorating Pulaski's March 4 birthday

References

External links

 Official website

Parades in New York City
Culture of New York City
Polish-American history
Polish-American culture in New York City
1937 establishments in New York City
Monuments and memorials to Casimir Pulaski